Count Philipp Ludwig III of Hanau-Münzenberg ( in Hanau – 12 November 1641 in The Hague) was the last count of the main Hanau-Münzenberg line of the House of Hanau.  After his death, the Hanau-Münzenberg-Schwarzenfels line inherited Hanau-Münzenberg.

Youth 
Philipp Ludwig was the eldest son of Count Philipp Moritz of Hanau-Münzenberg and Princess Sibylle Christine of Anhalt-Dessau.

In 1634, the political situation in the Thirty Years' War forced Philipp Moritz to flee with his family.  He fled via Metz, Châlons, Rouen and Amsterdam to his Orange-Nassau relatives in Delft and The Hague.  Philipp Moritz returned to Hanau-Münzenberg in 1637, however, he left his son with his mother, Countess Catharina Belgica of Nassau.

Philipp Moritz died in 1638, only 33 years old.  Thus Philipp Ludwig III inherited Hanau-Münzenberg at the age of 5.  The Reichskammergericht appointed his mother as his sole guardian.  Unlike earlier rulers of Hanau-Münzenberg, she maintained a relaxed relationship with the Hanau-Münzenberg-Schwarzenfels line of the family.

Death 
Philipp Ludwig III died of the measles at the age of 8, on 12 November 1641 in The Hague.  He was the last member of the main Hanau-Münzenberg line.  His siblings had all died before him.  Hanau-Münzenberg was inherited by his first cousin once removed Count Johann Ernst of Hanau-Münzenberg-Schwarzenfels.  When Johann Ernst died a year later, Hanau-Münzenberg fell to the Hanau-Lichtenberg line.

Philipp Ludwig III was buried on 18 February 1646 in the family crypt in the Church of St. Mary in Hanau, together with his mother and his successor.  His pewter coffin was stolen in 1812, during the chaos of the Napoleonic Wars.  He was reburied in a joint coffin, together with corpses from other coffins that had also been stolen.

Ancestors

References 
 Reinhard Dietrich: Die Landesverfassung in dem Hanauischen, in the series Hanauer Geschichtsblätter, vol. 34, Hanau, 1996, p. 96
 Jacobus Hindermeier: Leichenpredigt, Straßburg, 1641
 Reinhard Suchier: Genealogie des Hanauer Grafenhauses in: Festschrift des Hanauer Geschichtsvereins zu seiner fünfzigjährigen Jubelfeier am 27. August 1894, Hanau, 1894
 Ernst J. Zimmermann: Hanau Stadt und Land'', 3rd ed., Hanau, 1919, reprinted 1978

Footnotes 

Counts of Hanau-Münzenberg
German people of the Thirty Years' War
1632 births
1641 deaths
17th-century German people